Liang Zhenpu (梁振蒲) (1863–1932) was a Chinese martial artist.

Biography
Liang Zhenpu was born in Beihaojia Village in Ji County in Hebei province on May 20, 1863 during the Qing dynasty under the reign of the Tongzhi Emperor. He trained in Tan Tui and Biaozhang during his early childhood. At the age of 13, he moved to Beijing to become an apprentice at his father's second-hand clothing store. At this time he had the nickname "Second Hand Clothing Liang". During this period, in 1877, he became a direct disciple of Baguazhang creator Dong Haichuan. He studied with Dong for about five years, also learning from Dong's other students including Cheng Tinghua, Yin Fu, Shi Jidong, and Liu Fengchun. After the death of both his parents at age 20, he opened a martial arts kwoon to make a living.

In Ji County he defeated the four "Batian" gangs. In 1899, he saw many injustices being committed by local gangs in the Beijing suburb of Majiapu (马家堡）and single-handedly fought over 200 gang members armed only with a seven-section chain whip, killing 20 and wounding over 50. He was subsequently imprisoned and sentenced to death. When the Eight-Nation Alliance army invaded Beijing to crush the Boxer Rebellion, his prison was heavily damaged and he managed to escape.

Liang Zhenpu died on August 13, 1932, at the age of 69. He is the only student of Dong Haichuan to be buried next to his tomb.

Baguazhang style
As the youngest disciple of Dong, he trained not only with Dong but also with both Yin Fu and Cheng Tinghua, and as a result his style of Baguazhang has some characteristics of both styles. Examples include the Ox Tongue Palm from Yin Style and wrestling movements from Cheng Style. His Baguazhang forms are taught in a circle with the exception of Liu Dekuan's 64 Linear Palms, unlike versions from earlier students (for example, Yin Style Baguazhang) which have many linear segments. One of Liang's most famous students was Li Ziming (1903–1993) who eventually became head of the Beijing Baguazhang Research Association and spread Liang's style around the world.

Liang Zhenpu style Baguazhang is known to include the following elements:

 Ji Ben Gong (Basic Techniques)
 Zhuang Fa (Standing Methods)
 Bu Fa (Footwork)
 Dan Cao Ba Shi (Eight Single Techniques)
 Dui Lian Ba Shi (Partnered Exercises/Matched Eight Techniques)
 Ding Shi Ba Zhang (Eight Mother Palms)
 Ba Da Zhang aka Lao Ba Zhang (Old Eight Palms)
 Zhi Tang 64 Zhang (64 Linear Palms)
 Ba Mian Zhang (Eight Directions Palms)
 Big Broadsword
 Straight Sword
 Spear
 Rooster Knives
 Chicken Claw Knives
 Mandarin Duck Knives
 Crescent Moon Knives (aka Deer Horn Knives)
 Kun Lun Fan
 Yin Yang Pen Brush
 Steel "Yo-Yo" Meteors
 Seven Star Rod
 Wind and Fire Rings
 Lian Huan Zhang (Swimming Body Chain Linking Form)
 Long Xing Zhang (Dragon Form Palm)
 Qishier Qinna (72 grasps and seizes, grappling technique)
 Long and Short Weapons

References

 Li Gongcheng李功成, Dong Haichuan Bagua Zhuanzhang Jiji Shu 董海川八卦转掌技击术, Beijing Tiyu Chubanshe 北京体育大学出版社 (Beijing Physical Education University Press), Beijing, 1994.
 Jilin Province Wushu Association Baguazhang Branch website
 Wikipedia Chinese
 Hudong.com Interactive Encyclopedia

1863 births
1932 deaths
Chinese baguazhang practitioners
Qing dynasty Taoists
Republic of China Taoists
I Ching
Sportspeople from Tianjin